Fred "Snowflake" Toones (January 5, 1906 – February 13, 1962) was an American actor and comedian. He appeared in over 200 films in his career spanning 23 years.

Career
He appeared in over 200 films between 1928 and 1951. His standard characterization was that of a middle-aged "colored" man with a high-pitched voice and childlike demeanor. Like ‘Curly’ Howard and Tommy ‘Tiny’ Lister, who followed the black tradition of using an antonymous nickname as both their professional name and character name, "Snowflake" was the distinct stage name by which Toones was best known, and he used this name as his credit as early as his third film, 1931's Shanghaied Love. Likewise, in Shanghaied Love and over 35 other films, “Snowflake” was also Toones’ character name.

Toones acted in films such as Mississippi (1935), Hawk of the Wilderness (1938), and Daredevils of the Red Circle (1939) with Bruce Bennett and in many "B" westerns such as The Lawless Nineties (1936) with John Wayne.  He also appeared in dozens of two-reelers such as Columbia's Woman Haters (1934) and Sock-a-Bye Baby (1942) with the Three Stooges, and had a bit role in Laurel and Hardy's classic feature Way Out West (1937). Toones is also a familiar face in four Preston Sturges comedies: 20th Century (1934), Remember the Night (1940), Christmas in July (1940) and The Palm Beach Story (1942).

Toones first appeared as a porter in 1932 in The Hurricane Express, and was usually typecast as a porter – appearing in over 50 films in such a role. He also played a variety of other service-oriented or domestic worker roles such as stable grooms, janitors, elevator operators, valets, cooks, bellhops, doormen, butlers, and bartenders.

Toones played a bootblack or shoeshine man in at least six of his movies, and in film director William Witney's autobiography, Witney reveals that in addition to playing supporting roles and bit parts, Toones actually ran the shoeshine stand at Republic Studios.

His being cast in only comedic bit parts and small nonsupporting roles meant his efforts were more often than not uncredited (of 210 films where he made an appearance, he was credited in 73 of them).

Toones died on February 13, 1962, in Los Angeles, California.

Partial filmography

 Ladies' Night in a Turkish Bath (1928) (uncredited)
 Shanghaied Love (1931)
 Mark of the Spur (1932)
 The Arm of the Law (1932)
 Police Court (1932)
 Single-Handed Sanders (1932)
 The County Fair (1932)
 I Am a Fugitive from a Chain Gang (1932) (uncredited)
 Out of Singapore (1932)
 Human Targets (1932)
 Before Midnight (1933)
 Central Airport (1933) (uncredited)
 Golddiggers of 1933 (1933) (uncredited)
 Palooka (1934)
 Woman Haters (1934; first Three Stooges short) (uncredited)
 Twentieth Century (1934) (uncredited)
 Murder in the Private Car (1934)
 Valley of Wanted Men (1935)
 Speed Limited (1935)
 Frontier Justice (1935)
 Come and Get It (1936)
 Hell-Ship Morgan (1936)
 The Lawless Nineties (1936)
 Desert Justice (1936)
 Hair-Trigger Casey (1936)
 The Lonely Trail (1936)
 Oh, Susanna! (1936)
 Racing Blood (1936)
 Born to Fight (1936)
 A Star Is Born (1937) (uncredited)
 Yodelin' Kid from Pine Ridge (1937)
 Range Defenders (1937)
 Under the Big Top (1938)
 Hawk of the Wilderness (1938 serial)
 Dodge City (1939) (uncredited)
 Daredevils of the Red Circle (1939 serial)
 Mr. Smith Goes to Washington (1939) (uncredited)
 Remember the Night (1940)
 Christmas in July (1940)
 The Biscuit Eater (1940)
 The Great American Broadcast (1941)  (uncredited)
 The Great Man's Lady (1942)
 Give Out, Sisters (1942)
 The Palm Beach Story (1942)
 Haunted Ranch (1943)
 Land of Hunted Men (1943)
 The Lost Weekend (1945) (uncredited)
 Fool's Gold (1947)
 Bells of San Angelo (1947)

See also

Willie Best (billed in five films as "Sleep 'n' Eat")
Stepin Fetchit
Mantan Moreland

References

External links

 
 Fred 'Snowflake' Toones at B-Westerns.com

1906 births
1962 deaths
American male film actors
African-American male actors
Male actors from North Carolina
20th-century American male actors
20th-century African-American people